Völkerfreundschaft means "peoples' friendship" in the German language.  It may refer to:

 MS Völkerfreundschaft, the former name of the cruise ship 
 Star of People's Friendship, an order awarded by East Germany
 Fountain of Friendship between Peoples, a fountain in Berlin, at the Alexanderplatz
 Platz der Völkerfreundschaft, the central public square in Rieth (Erfurt), Thuringia, Germany
 Völkerfreundschaft, a subdivision in Zeitz, Burgenlandkreis, Saxony-Anhalt, Germany
 Amerikahaus, an American cultural center in Westend (Frankfurt am Main), Germany

See also